is a Japanese professional boxer. He is the current WBO Asia Pacific Super Flyweight Champion and held the Japanese Super Flyweight title. Funai is highly ranked in the Super Flyweight Division at #11 and in 2018-2019 ranked by the IBF at #1 spot. He was born and raised in Tokyo.

Professional career

On 14 June 2018, Funai fought former world title contender Warlito Parrenas of the Philippines for the WBO Asia Pacific super-flyweight title, and won it by 8th-round knockout. Funai faced Jerwin Ancajas for the IBF super-flyweight title on 5 May 2019, losing by a 7th round stoppage due to ring doctor's advice.

Professional boxing record

References

External links

1985 births
Living people
Japanese male boxers
Super-flyweight boxers
Sportspeople from Tokyo
21st-century Japanese people